The Witwer Grocery Company Building, also known as the Osada Building or more recently as the Bottleworks Loft Condominiums, is an historic structure located in Cedar Rapids, Iowa, United States. The building served as the grocery warehouse for the Witwer Grocery Company, a local Cedar Rapids grocer which included MeToo stores from 1946 to 1965 and had a bottling facility for Life Cola and Hires Root Beer on the first floor. It was designed by the architectural firm of Blahnik & Berger and was completed in 1946. The building was extensively renovated from 1996 to 1997 into apartments. A full height atrium was created in the buildings core. It was listed on the National Register of Historic Places in 1998, and is part of the Commercial & Industrial Development of Cedar Rapids MPS. The Osada complex closed in 2007 and was remodeled into Bottleworks Loft Condominiums post-2008 flood.

References

Office buildings completed in 1946
Apartment buildings in Cedar Rapids, Iowa
National Register of Historic Places in Cedar Rapids, Iowa
Industrial buildings and structures on the National Register of Historic Places in Iowa
Grocery store buildings